The Leif Ericson Millennium commemorative coins are a series of coins issued in 2000 by the United States Mint to commemorate the 1,000th anniversary of Leif Ericson's discovery of the Americas.

United States coin 
One of the two coins of the series was a silver one dollar coin.  The obverse features a portrait of Leif Ericson, designed by John Mercanti.  The reverse features Ericson's ship, designed by T. James Ferrell.  Of the 500,000 coins authorized, the Philadelphia Mint struck 28,150 uncirculated and 58,612 proof coins.

Icelandic coin 
The other coin had the same composition and specifications as the silver dollar, but was denominated in 1,000 Icelandic króna.  The obverse features an image of Stirling Calder’s sculpture of Leif Ericson, while the reverse features an eagle, a dragon, a bull and the giant from the Icelandic Coat of Arms.  Both sides of the coin were designed by Throstur Magnusson.  A maximum mintage of 150,000 coins was authorized, of which 15,947 were produced at the Philadelphia Mint (all with a proof finish without a mintmark).

See also
 
 
 United States commemorative coins
 List of United States commemorative coins and medals (2000s)
 Icelandic króna

References 

Leif Erikson
Modern United States commemorative coins